Golshanabad (also Romanized as Golshanābād) is a village in Firuzeh Rural District, in the Central District of Firuzeh County, Razavi Khorasan Province, Iran. At the 2006 census, its population was 461, in 126 families.

References 

Populated places in Firuzeh County